State Route 234 (SR 234) is a  east–west state highway located in the southwestern part of the U.S. state of Georgia. It travels through portions of Calhoun and Dougherty counties.

Route description
SR 234 begins at an intersection with SR 45 northeast of Morgan in Calhoun County. The route runs east, passing Calhoun County Road 45 (Lizard Lope Road, which leads to Conley Cemetery), Calhoun CR 136 (Wildemeade Road), and Calhoun CR 119, before it reaches an intersection with SR 55, northeast of Leary. Shortly after SR 55, the route crosses into Dougherty County. Farther to the east, SR 234 intersects Tallahassee Road, which leads to Sasser. Just before entering Albany, the road passes Live Oak Elementary School. In downtown Albany, it passes Darton State College. Farther in, it has a very brief concurrency with US 19 Business/US 82 Business/SR 520 Business. Then, it passes Albany Technical College just before intersections with SR 62 (Slappey Boulevard) and SR 91 (Newton Road). SR 91 leads to Southwest Georgia Regional Airport. Just before ending, it crosses over the Flint River. On the eastern edge of Albany it meets its eastern terminus, an interchange with US 19/SR 3/SR 133/SR 300. Here, US 19/SR 3/SR 300, as well as SR 133 north, are known as Liberty Expressway, while SR 133 south continues the roadway of SR 234 along Moultrie Road.

No section of SR 234 is part of the National Highway System.

History

SR 234 was established, and paved, in 1946 along the same alignment as it runs today.

Major intersections

See also

References

External links

 

234
Transportation in Calhoun County, Georgia
Transportation in Dougherty County, Georgia